Bootleggers is a 1969 Italian-Spanish crime-action film written and directed by Alfio Caltabiano and starring George Eastman and Wayde Preston. Set in the U.S., it was shot between Spain and Amalfi.

Cast
 George Eastman as  McGowan aka "The Irish"
 Wayde Preston as  Grimm Doyle
 Graziella Granata as  Letizia
 Tano Cimarosa as  Moncio
  Archie Savage as  Jeremiah
 José Suárez as  "The Engineer"
 Eduardo Fajardo as  Sir Louis Baymond
 Nello Pazzafini as Gangster at Brothel
  Antonella Murgia as Mary
  Gianni Solaro as  Inspector
 Sandro Dori as Mary's husband
 Tito García as Prison warden Charlie
  Goyo Lebrero as The Barber
  Gia Sandri as Brothel Madam
 Alan Collins as The Boss
 Paul Müller as Pythagoras
 Alfio Caltabiano as Card Player

References

External links

Italian crime action films
Spanish crime action films
1960s crime action films
Films directed by Alfio Caltabiano
Films set in Mexico
Films set in the United States
Films about prohibition in the United States
1960s Italian films